Marharyta Dzhusova (born 29 November 1998) is a Ukrainian diver. She won a bronze medal at the 2015 European Games in 3m synchro together with Diana Shelestyuk. She also finished 13th in the 3m springboard event and 22nd in the 1m springboard event at the Games.

References

1998 births
Living people
Ukrainian female divers
Divers at the 2015 European Games
European Games bronze medalists for Ukraine
European Games medalists in diving
21st-century Ukrainian women